Motilal Nehru School of Sports is a boarding school located in Rai in Sonipat district of the Indian state of Haryana. It was founded in July 1973 by the Government of Haryana. The school is organized on the public school pattern. It is fully residential and co-educational. The school is a member of the Indian Public Schools Conference and affiliated to the Central Board of Secondary Education for the Secondary (Class X) and Senior Secondary (Class XII) Examinations. It is ranked amongst the top 10 boarding schools in the country as per the education world rankings 2016.

Institutional Framework
The administration of the School is vested in a Special Board for the Haryana. The expenditure on academics and sports is heavily subsidised by the state Government. School is a prestigious boarding school. Students participate and compete with various public schools some of the counterparts are Sainik school, Rastriya Indian Military College, Mayo College, The Doon School, Welham Boys' School and Scindia School. Students have given an outstanding performance in sports at various national level tournaments. School also aims to prepare students for entry into the National Defence Academy (NDA). More than 400 students from the school have qualified in Indian Armed Forces so far .

Staff
The academic and administrative head of the school is the Principal and Director. He is assisted by the Vice- Principal and Bursar (Administrative Officer).
Sports coaches are drawn from three sources: The school, The Sports Authority of India and The Sports Department, Haryana. The teaching staff consists of fully qualified and trained teachers with the necessary attributes and aptitude to work in a residential school.

Sections

The school is divided into four houses. Each student is assigned a house at the start of his time in the school and will remain in that house for the whole of their school career.

Memberships
The School is a member of Indian Public Schools' Conference (IPSC).

Notable alumni
 Randeep Hooda
Meghna Malik
Dr Harsh Bhanwala
Sudhanshu Vats
Navdeep Singh Virk IPS
Sanjay Kundu IPS
Capt Ravinder Chikkara KC (P)
Jitender Rana IPS
Vijay Dhull IPS
Anurag Arya IPS
Krupali Patel
Vikas Sheoran
Sameer Gehlot
Maj Gen Sanjeev Grover
Mahender Jakhar
Jitender Yadav IAS
Dr Amrita Duhan IPS
Dr Preeti Gehlaut Nara
Capt Manoj Khatri HCS
Chitra Sarvara
Pramod Sehwag
Ashish Chaudhary, HPS
Dr Kulbir Ahlawat
Anirudh Chautala
Monika Rana IRS
Padamjit Sehrawat

Sports University of Haryana
On 14 February 2019, the cabinet of Haryana approved a state funded sports university named Sports University of Haryana in the school's existing campus. The bill to setup university was passed by assembly in August 2019.  Sports Minister of Haryana, Anil Vij, informed on 14 September 2019 that Kapil Dev, the world cup winning former captain of cricket teams of India, will be the first Chancellor of the university.

References

External links
 

Sport schools in India
High schools and secondary schools in Haryana
CBSE Delhi
1973 establishments in Haryana